State Highway 180 (SH 180)  is a highway that runs through Tarrant County and Dallas County in Texas (USA) between Interstate 35W in Fort Worth, running east to Loop 12 in Dallas. From Loop 12 in Dallas to Interstate 35W in Fort Worth, State Highway 180 follows the old routing of U.S. Route 80. Signage still shows the part from Loop 12 to Beckley Boulevard as SH-180 although it had been removed from the state system in 2014.

Route description
The entire route runs no more than a few miles south parallel of the former Dallas-Fort Worth Turnpike (now Interstate 30), but does not intersect with it at any point.

The highway begins as Lancaster Avenue from Interstate 35W just southeast of downtown Fort Worth.

Entering Arlington, it becomes Division Street, and passes just south of AT&T Stadium and Globe Life Field.

After entering Grand Prairie, it becomes Main Street, passing through mainly older commercial buildings and the city's downtown area.

When it enters Dallas, it becomes Davis Street to Loop 12.

History
SH 180 was previously designated on November 30, 1932 from Annona north to then-SH 5. This highway was SH 5A before March 19, 1930, and was erroneously omitted from the March 19, 1930 state highway log. SH 180 was decommissioned on January 25, 1938. This was redesignated as SH 5 Spur on February 20, 1939, which was redesignated as Spur 23 on September 26, 1939, and FM 44 on May 19, 1942.

The current SH 180 was designated on August 28, 1991 when US 80 was decommissioned west of Mesquite. On October 30, 2014, the section of SH 180 from Loop 12 to Interstate 35E was removed from the state highway system and returned to the city of Dallas.

Junction list

References

External links

180
Transportation in Tarrant County, Texas
Transportation in Dallas County, Texas
U.S. Route 80